The Hentchmen are an American garage punk band from Detroit, Michigan, United States, formed in October 1992.  Early performances were in Ann Arbor and Detroit.  Occasionally the band  featured Jack White before he formed the White Stripes.

Career
The instrumental part of the Hentchmen's "Chrissy Rides Again" on the Broad Appeal album, is similar to the extended instrumental added to the live performance by the Lene Lovich band, when playing "Lucky Number" on the TV show Rock Goes to College.

Members
John Szymanskiorgan, vocals
Tim Purrierguitar
Chris Handysidedrums
Mike Latulippedrums
Jack Whiteoccasional guest member

Discography

Albums
Ultra Hentch 1994
Campus Party 1995
Broad Appeal 1997
Motorvatin 1998
Hentch-Forth.Five 1998
Three Times Infinity 2002
Form Follows Function 2004
The Hentchmen 2008
It's Hentch-O-Ween 2010

References

External links
The Hentchmen with Jack White, Hentch-Forth.Five | NME

Garage rock groups from Michigan
Garage punk groups
Indie rock musical groups from Michigan
Musical groups established in 1992
Musical groups from Detroit
1992 establishments in Michigan